Halysidota yapacaniae is a moth of the family Erebidae. It was described by Watson in 1980. It is found in Bolivia.

References

Halysidota
Moths described in 1980